Nathaniel "Crash" Craddock (born December 3, 1940) is a former American football fullback who played college football for Parsons College and professional football in the National Football League (NFL) for the Baltimore Colts during the 1963 season and in the Canadian Football League (CFL) during the 1964 and 1965 seasons.

Early years
A native of Des Moines, Iowa, he played college football at Parsons in Fairfield, Iowa, from 1959 to 1962.

Professional football
He played professional football for the Baltimore Colts during the 1963 season, appearing in three NFL games.

He also played in the Canadian Football League (CFL) for the Montreal Alouettes during the 1964 and 1965 seasons. He appeared in nine CFL games.

Later years
After retiring from football, Craddock worked as a strength and conditioning coach at a Des Moines high school and as the intramural program coordinator at Kirkwood Community College. In 1984, he opened a Nautilus fitness center in Cedar Rapids, Iowa.

References

1940 births
Living people
American football fullbacks
Baltimore Colts players
Montreal Alouettes players
People from Des Moines, Iowa
Players of American football from Iowa